The 1921 New York Yankees season was the 19th season for the Yankees. The team finished with a record of 98–55, winning their first pennant in franchise history, winning the American League by 4 games over the previous year's champion, the Cleveland Indians. New York was managed by Miller Huggins. Their home games were played at the Polo Grounds.

Regular season
With star slugger Babe Ruth hitting 59 home runs, setting a new major league home run record for the third consecutive year, while also having his greatest overall season statistically, the Yankees appeared to be the team to beat in the World Series. Their landlords, the New York Giants, had rebuilt after slipping a bit in the late 1910s, and had won the National League pennant. For the first time, all the games of a World Series would be held in the same ballpark, the Polo Grounds. The best-5-of-9 Series (its last before returning to the best-4-of-7 format) saw the Yankees take a 2 games to 0 lead and later a 3–2 series lead, but Ruth suffered a serious injury in game 3 that limited his appearances in the remaining games, save for one pinch-hit appearance, and the Giants rallied to win the Series 5 games to 3.

Season standings

Record vs. opponents

Roster

Player stats

Batting

Starters by position
Note: Pos = Position; G = Games played; AB = At bats; H = Hits; Avg. = Batting average; HR = Home runs; RBI = Runs batted in

Other batters
Note: G = Games played; AB = At bats; H = Hits; Avg. = Batting average; HR = Home runs; RBI = Runs batted in

Pitching

Starting pitchers
Note: G = Games pitched; IP = Innings pitched; W = Wins; L = Losses; ERA = Earned run average; SO = Strikeouts

Other pitchers
Note: G = Games pitched; IP = Innings pitched; W = Wins; L = Losses; ERA = Earned run average; SO = Strikeouts

Relief pitchers
Note: G = Games pitched; W = Wins; L = Losses; SV = Saves; ERA = Earned run average; SO = Strikeouts

World series

Awards and honors

Major league records 
 Babe Ruth, major league record, Most total bases in one season (457)

Franchise records
 Babe Ruth, Yankees single season record, runs scored in a season (177)

Notes

References 
1921 New York Yankees team page at www.baseball-almanac.com
1921 New York Yankees at Baseball Reference

External links 

Yankees game log at baseball-almanac.com

New York Yankees seasons
New York Yankees
New York Yankees
1920s in Manhattan
American League champion seasons
Washington Heights, Manhattan